William Goodrich may refer to:

 William Goodrich, film director pseudonym used by Roscoe Arbuckle 
 William Goodrich (died 1812), privateer, son of John Goodrich
 William M. Goodrich (1777–1833), American organ builder